The Andros Targets is a 1977 American newspaper drama television series starring James Sutorius which centers around a crusading newspaper reporter who uncovers corruption in New York City. The show aired from January 31 to May 16, 1977.

Cast
James Sutorius as Mike Andros
Pamela Reed as Sandi Farrell
Roy Poole as Chet Reynolds
Alan Mixon as Norman Kale
Ted Beniades as Wayne Hillman
Jordan Charney as Ted Bergman

Synopsis

Mike Andros is an investigative reporter for a major metropolitan newspaper in New York City, the fictional New York Forum. He focuses his work on uncovering corruption. Sandi Farrell is his young assistant. Chet Reynolds is the New York Forums managing editor, Norman Kale is its city editor, and Ted Bergman is its metropolitan editor. Wayne Hillman is another reporter on the Forums staff and Andross friend.

Production

Created by Jerome Coopersmith, The Andros Targets was based on the experiences of investigative journalist Nicholas Gage, who is listed in the shows opening credits as its "journalistic consultant." Bob Sweeney and Larry Rosen were its executive producers. Coopersmith wrote all 13 episodes, and his co-writers on one or more episodes were George Bellak, Frank Cucci, Tim Maschler, and Irving Gaynor Neiman.

Sweeney directed one episode. Other episode directors were Marc Daniels, Harry Falk, Edward H. Feldman, Irving J. Moore, Seymour Robbie , and Don Weis.

Broadcast history

The Andros Targets aired on Mondays at 10:00 p.m., premiering on January 31, 1977. Its last original episode aired on May 16, 1977. Reruns of the show returned to prime time in July 1977, the last of them  airing on July 9.

Episodes

Sources

References

External links
 The Andros Targets opening credits (with Spanish subtitles) on YouTube
 February 21, 1977, CBS promo for The Andros Targets episode "The Treatment Succeeded But the Patient Died"

CBS original programming
1977 American television series debuts
1977 American television series endings
1970s American drama television series
English-language television shows
Television shows set in New York City